Washington is a state located in the Pacific Northwest region of the United States. As of the 2020 U.S. census, Washington is the 13th most populous state, with  inhabitants, and the 18th largest by land area, spanning  of land. Washington is divided into 39 counties and contains 281 municipalities that are divided into cities and towns.

Legally, a city in Washington can be described primarily by its class. There are five classes of municipalities in Washington: first class city, second class city, town, unclassified city, and code city.

 First class cities are the 10 cities with a population over 10,000 at the time of reorganization and operating under a home rule charter. They are permitted to perform any function specifically granted them by Title 35 RCW (Revised Code of Washington).
 Second class cities are the 9 cities with a population over 1,500 at the time of reorganization and operating without a home rule charter. Like first class cities, they are permitted to perform any function specifically granted them by Title 35 RCW.
 Towns are the 69 municipalities with a population of under 1,500 at the time of reorganization. Towns are not authorized to operate under a charter. Like the previously listed cities, they are permitted to perform any function specifically granted them by Title 35 RCW. In 1994, the legislature made 1,500 the minimum population required to incorporate.
 Unclassified cities are cities that are not operating under any other class. Only one city—Waitsburg, in Walla Walla County—is unclassified. It operates under the 1881 territorial charter under which it was organized, eight years before Washington was admitted to the Union in 1889.
 Code cities were created by the state legislature in order to grant the greatest degree of local control to municipalities possible under the state constitution and general law. This classification has been adopted by 192 municipalities in Washington. Code cities (shorthand for optional municipal code cities, as encoded by Title 35A RCW) are authorized to perform any function not specifically denied them in the state constitution or by state law. They may perform any function granted to any other city classification under Title 35 RCW.

A city in Washington can be described by its form of government. Cities and towns are specifically authorized three forms of government: Commission, Mayor-Council, Council-Manager. The last city to use the three-member commission form of government was Shelton. In a 2017 Proposition, the residents voted to adopt the council-manager structure. Most cities in Washington have the mayor-council form of government, which calls for an elected mayor and an elected city council. Cities with a council-manager system have an elected council and appointed city manager. In addition, if the population of code cities is over 10,000, they may incorporate as charter code cities. They may then "set out any plan of government deemed 'suitable for the good government of the city'" (RCW 35A.08.050), which need not be a commission, mayor-council, or council-manager form. No charter code city has opted for a different type of government .

The largest municipality by population in Washington is Seattle with 737,015 residents, and the smallest municipality by population is Krupp with 49 residents.

List of cities

List of towns

Notes

References
General
  Up-to-date table of Washington municipalities.
  Database of places noting county seats.

External links 
Title 35 RCW (governing all cities)
Title 35A RCW (governing code cities)
Municipal Research & Services Center of Washington

Washington
Washington
Cities